Slay may refer to:

 Murder, to commit homicide
 cause death, to terminate biological function of a living creature or object

People
 Brandon Slay, former American Olympic wrestler
 DJ Kay Slay (1966–2022), American hip hop DJ
 Dwayne Slay (born 1984), American football player
 Francis G. Slay (born 1955), mayor of St. Louis, Missouri, United States
 Frank Slay (1930–2017), American songwriter, record producer
 Jill Slay, British-Australian engineer and computer scientist
 Tamar Slay (born 1980), American basketball player
 Darius Slay (born 1991), American football player

Other uses
 Slay (video game), a turn-based strategy video game
 SLAY Radio, an Internet radio station
 SLAY (novel), a 2019 young adult novel by Brittney Morris
 Slay Tracks (1933–1969), an album by Pavement
 Santa's Slay, a 2005 comedy horror film

See also

 
 Slayer (disambiguation)
 Sleigh (disambiguation)